O'Tacos is a French fast food chain founded in 2007. Headquartered in Montrouge near Paris, O'Tacos has restaurants all over France and has also expanded internationally: it is found in various cities of Belgium, Germany, Luxembourg, Algiers and Annaba in Algeria, Casablanca, Rabat, Marrakesh, and Agadir in Morocco, and Utrecht and Maastricht in the Netherlands. The chain specializes in "French tacos", a fast food dish that consists of a flour tortilla wrap with French fries, meat and cheese.

History 
In 2007, Patrick Pelonero, Sliman Traoré, Samba Traoré and Sauroutou Diarra opened their first "French tacos" restaurant in Grenoble, in the Rhône-Alpes region where this French twist on a Mexican dish was pioneered. They later opened the first O'Tacos restaurant in Bordeaux in 2010. In 2014, they adopted the franchise system. The first restaurant under franchise opened in Ivry and 24 other restaurants followed during the same year.

International expansion 
Their first international opening was in Marrakesh, Morocco. The chain then opened their first restaurant in Belgium in Schaerbeek, a Brussels neighbourhood, and their target customers are students. Since then it expanded further in Brussels as well as other Belgian cities including Ghent, Antwerp, and Charleroi. In January 2017, O'Tacos opened its first location in North America in the New York City borough of Brooklyn. The Brooklyn location has since closed.

Products 
O'Tacos restaurants specialize in "French tacos", a fast food dish from the region of Rhône-Alpes in South-East France, which consists of a grilled flour tortilla folded around a filling of French fries, meat and cheese. They deliver made to order sandwiches, with customers getting to choose their own ingredients, such as the type of meat, sauce or additional ingredients, as well as the size (modeled after clothing sizes): M, L, XL, or XXL. Their signature product is the "Gigatacos" which weighs more than 2 kg (roughly 4.4 lbs). The chain uses halal-certified meat in order to accommodate Muslim customers.

Controversies

Valenciennes restaurant 
On September 12, 2017, the publicized opening of a franchised restaurant in Valenciennes (with the presence of rapper Gradur) ended in clashes between the police and youths who came to the event. The restaurant then had to be closed for a week for administrative reasons. On December 2, 2017, the restaurant almost caught fire because of an electrical issue with one of the refrigerators, and had to be closed for several weeks. After a stand-off between the local authorities and the franchise holders, the restaurant reopened in December, with many customers expressing their enthusiasm on social media. On March 26, 2018, a newly-installed fryer caught fire, causing intervention from the fire department. The restaurant had to close again for a number of days.

Pigalle restaurant strike 
An O’Tacos restaurant located in the Paris neighbourhood of Pigalle was closed on February 9, 2018, as 24 employees went on strike, accusing the manager of not paying them for months, falsifying pay slips and withholding annual leave. Some employees also complained about sexual harassment and assault from their manager. The chain then publicly stated that they "opened an internal investigation" and the manager's license was suspended.

Qwartz restaurant incident 
On July 1, 2018, an expansion joint broke in an O'Tacos restaurant located in the Qwartz mall in Villeneuve-la-Garenne, causing the floor tiles to pop off the floor one by one. Panic ensued in that part of the mall, as some customers believed they were under a terrorist attack, as reported by social media.

See also 
 List of fast food restaurant chains

References

External links 
 

Fast-food chains of France